Celosa con Flor Silvestre y otros éxitos (Celosa with Flor Silvestre and Other Hits) is a studio album by Mexican singer Flor Silvestre, released in 1966 by Musart Records.

Track listing
Side one

Side two

Charts

References

Spanish-language albums
Flor Silvestre albums
Musart Records albums
1966 albums